A list of earliest films produced in Argentina between 1897 and 1929 ordered by year of release. For an A-Z list of Argentine films see :Category:Argentine films

Pre 1910

1910s

1920s

External links
 Argentine film at the Internet Movie Database

1897
Films
Argentine
Films
Argentine
Films
Argentine
Films
Argentine